The 1973 Fred Perry Japan Open Tennis Championships was a combined men's and women's tennis tournament played on outdoor hard courts and took place in Tokyo, Japan. The tournament was held from 8 October through 14 October 1973. The men's events were part of the 1973 Commercial Union Assurance Grand Prix circuit and graded as B category whereas the women's competition was a non-tour event. Ken Rosewall won the men's singles title, earning him the $12,000 first prize, while Evonne Goolagong won the women's singles event and received $5,000.

Finals

Men's singles
 Ken Rosewall defeated  John Newcombe, 6–1, 6–4

Men's doubles
 Mal Anderson /  Ken Rosewall defeated  Colin Dibley /  Allan Stone, 7–5, 7–5

Women's singles
 Evonne Goolagong defeated  Helga Niessen Masthoff, 6–3, 6–4

References

External links
 Official website
  Association of Tennis Professionals (ATP) tournament profile

Japan Open Tennis Championships
Japan Open Tennis Championships
Japan Open Tennis Championships
Japan Open (tennis)